Our Lady of Mercy Academy is a private Catholic College preparatory school for young women, founded in 1928 in Syosset, NY. The academy is governed by a board of directors and sponsored by the Sisters of Mercy.

Our Lady of Mercy Academy is chartered by the Board of Regents of the State of New York, is accredited by the Middle States Association of Colleges and Secondary Schools and is a member of the Mercy Secondary Education Association and the National Catholic Education Association. There are over 30 extracurricular activities, including a sports program. There are tennis courts, a soccer field, 2 softball fields, and a gymnasium. In addition to a president and a principal there is an assistant principal, a director of curriculum and supervision, a director of technology, a director of mission effectiveness, and a director of athletics.

History
In the fall of 1928, 11 students were enrolled in Our Lady of Mercy Academy, originally created as a boarding school for young women. By the end of the year, there would be 30 students comprising the 8th and 9th grades.

The year before in 1927, the Sisters of Mercy of Brooklyn began plans for building a boarding school in Syosset. Its location in the Town of Oyster Bay, the cornerstone of colonial settlement of the north shore, suggested that the building be colonial in structure. In keeping with these early roots, the sisters envisioned a Georgian structure whose main entrance on Syosset-Woodbury Road would be enhanced by a tall-pillared portico with graceful Doric columns. Georgian influence would be seen in paneling, lighting fixtures and windows.

The distinguishing feature of the building is the colonial tower rising 117 feet and patterned after Independence Hall in Philadelphia.

Athletic Department offers softball, tennis, soccer, lacrosse and track. The Science and Art Departments use the grounds for extended classroom instruction and experimentation, including our Arbor Day ceremony of planting memorial trees.

Although the academy was built as a boarding school, it always made room for day students who were few in those early days. By 1964, however, with increased population growth on Long Island, it became obvious that there was not so much a need for a boarding school as for day students. Dormitories were converted into classrooms, and dining rooms into cafeterias. The parlors still remain for meeting parents and guests, and providing meetings for special events.

World War II brought difficult times to the academy. The school was involved in food stamps, rationing, victory gardens, air raid drills, and two hours of weekly instruction in First Aid. A few English students were sent to escape the bombing in Europe. Students could watch the young aviators training from local airfields, since the academy tower was used as a turning point for them, and they thrilled the students by tipping their plane wings in greeting.

The years after the war saw a tremendous growth in curriculum enrichment and parent participation. A PTA was established in 1948, and, with tremendous support from parents and friends, we were able to build a new gym in 1978. Curriculum has been enriched in art, dance, music and theatre. Advanced placement courses, college affiliation classes, computer labs, Internet access, on-line databases and a completely automated library media center, all indicate that OLMA has progressed from those early 20th century years with 11 students, 5 faculty and a Regents approved curriculum for the times, to the threshold of the 21st century with 500 students, 69 faculty and staff, and a curriculum providing access to all colleges and professions, and preparing women with a Catholic, value-centered future.

Curriculum
The academic curriculum includes an Honors program and Advanced Placement courses.
Seniors may enroll in accredited college courses offered through St. John's University.
The Advanced Placement courses are recognized by all colleges in accordance with their acceptance rules.
All freshmen are required to take half a year of dance and half a year of physical education, as well as music, computer technology, and regular subjects (Intro to Genre, World History, Math, science, and a language). The languages offered are Spanish, Italian, French, and Latin. Juniors and Seniors are required to enroll in electives, and are given to opportunity to choose among many: seven arts classes, computer classes, social sciences.
Online classes offered in Latin (which is a new and developing course that currently only covers the first and second levels of the language) and Economics.

Uniform
The uniform consists of a plaid kilt, white polo shirt, and a sweater.  Each grade level wears a different color skirt.  The skirt you receive as a freshman is again worn Sophomore year. Junior year a new skirt is worn and again worn senior year.  At the end of Sophomore year, the class votes on what kilt pattern they will wear for the next two years (so that Juniors and Seniors end up having different kilts).

Clubs and activities
The school nickname is the Lady Mustangs.

Art
Art National Honor Society
Badminton
Band
Basketball
Bowling (BOWLMA)
Creative writing
Crew
Cross country
Dance
Driver education
Ecology
Equality Club
Equestrian
Forensics
Italian National Honor Society
Lacrosse
Library
Math
Mercy Mentors
Mercy Players
Mixed chorus
Varsity Mock Trial Team
Mustangs Leading Mustangs
National Honor Society
Pro-life
Reverse Shakespeare 
SADD
Soccer
Softball
Spanish
Spanish National Honor Society
Sports Night and Spirit Week
Student council
Swimming
Tennis
Track and Field
Tri-M Music Honor Society
Video club
Volleyball
Windows (Literary Magazine)
Yearbook ("The Tower")

Traditions
"Mercy Girls" tend to refer to themselves as that throughout their time at school and well after graduation.  There are several respected traditions including the Senior Stairs (marble steps located in the center of the building reserved for use by Seniors and staff only) and the OLMA seal (a marble mosaic located at the foot of the Senior Stairs that is not stepped on).

References

External links
Our Lady of Mercy Academy

Syosset, New York
Girls' schools in New York (state)
Catholic secondary schools in New York (state)
Educational institutions established in 1928
Roman Catholic Diocese of Rockville Centre
Schools in Nassau County, New York
Sisters of Mercy schools
1928 establishments in New York (state)